Greg Lyman (born March 9, 1950) is an American speed skater. He competed in the men's 500 metres event at the 1972 Winter Olympics.

References

1950 births
Living people
American male speed skaters
Olympic speed skaters of the United States
Speed skaters at the 1972 Winter Olympics
Sportspeople from Gary, Indiana